Babeu is a surname. Notable people with the surname include:

Kuzman Babeu (born 1971), Serbian footballer and manager
Paul Babeu (born 1969), American politician